BepiColombo is a joint mission of the European Space Agency (ESA) and the Japan Aerospace Exploration Agency (JAXA) to the planet Mercury. The mission comprises two satellites launched together: the Mercury Planetary Orbiter (MPO) and Mio (Mercury Magnetospheric Orbiter, MMO). The mission will perform a comprehensive study of Mercury, including characterization of its magnetic field, magnetosphere, and both interior and surface structure. It was launched on an Ariane 5 rocket on 20 October 2018 at 01:45 UTC, with an arrival at Mercury planned for on 5 December 2025, after a flyby of Earth, two flybys of Venus, and six flybys of Mercury. The mission was approved in November 2009, after years in proposal and planning as part of the European Space Agency's Horizon 2000+ programme; it is the last mission of the programme to be launched.

Names 
BepiColombo is named after Giuseppe "Bepi" Colombo (1920–1984), a scientist, mathematician and engineer at the University of Padua, Italy, who first proposed the interplanetary gravity assist manoeuvre used by the 1974 Mariner 10 mission, a technique now used frequently by planetary probes.

Mio, the name of the Mercury Magnetospheric Orbiter, was selected from thousands of suggestions by the Japanese public. In Japanese, Mio means a waterway, and according to JAXA, it symbolizes the research and development milestones reached thus far, and wishes for safe travel ahead. JAXA said the spacecraft will travel through the solar wind just like a ship traveling through the ocean. In Chinese and Japanese, Mercury is known as the "water star" (水星) according to wǔxíng.

Following its Earth flyby in April 2020, BepiColombo was briefly mistaken for a near-Earth asteroid, receiving the provisional designation .

Mission 
The mission involves three components, which will separate into independent spacecraft upon arrival at Mercury.
 Mercury Transfer Module (MTM) for propulsion, built by ESA.
 Mercury Planetary Orbiter (MPO) built by ESA.
 Mercury Magnetospheric Orbiter (MMO) or Mio built by JAXA.

During the launch and cruise phases, these three components are joined together to form the Mercury Cruise System (MCS).

The prime contractor for ESA is Airbus Defence and Space. ESA is responsible for the overall mission, the design, development assembly and test of the propulsion and MPO modules, and the launch. The two orbiters, which are operated by mission controllers based in Darmstadt, Germany, were successfully launched together on 20 October 2018. The launch took place on Ariane flight VA245 from Europe’s Spaceport in Kourou, French Guiana. The spacecraft will have a seven-year interplanetary cruise to Mercury using solar-electric propulsion (ion thrusters) and gravity assists from Earth, Venus and eventual gravity capture at Mercury. ESA's Cebreros, Spain  ground station is planned to be the primary ground facility for communications during all mission phases.

Expected to arrive in Mercury orbit on 5 December 2025, the Mio and MPO satellites will separate and observe Mercury in collaboration for one year, with a possible one-year extension. The orbiters are equipped with scientific instruments provided by various European countries and Japan. The mission will characterize the solid and liquid iron core ( of the planet's radius) and determine the size of each. The mission will also complete gravitational and magnetic field mappings. Russia provided gamma ray and neutron spectrometers to verify the existence of water ice in polar craters that are permanently in shadow from the Sun's rays.

Mercury is too small and hot for its gravity to retain any significant atmosphere over long periods of time, but it has a "tenuous surface-bounded exosphere" containing hydrogen, helium, oxygen, sodium, calcium, potassium and other trace elements. Its exosphere is not stable as atoms are continuously lost and replenished from a variety of sources. The mission will study the exosphere composition and dynamics, including generation and escape.

Objectives 
The main objectives of the mission are:

 Study the origin and evolution of a planet close to its parent star
 Study Mercury's form, interior, structure, geology, composition and craters
 Investigate Mercury's exosphere, composition and dynamics, including generation and escape
 Study Mercury's magnetised envelope (magnetosphere) – structure and dynamics
 Investigate the origin of Mercury's magnetic field
 Verify Einstein's theory of general relativity by measuring the parameters gamma and beta of the parameterized post-Newtonian formalism with high accuracy.

Design 

The stacked spacecraft will take seven years to position itself to enter Mercury orbit. During this time it will use solar-electric propulsion and nine gravity assists, flying past the Earth and Moon in April 2020, Venus in 2020 and 2021, and six Mercury flybys between 2021 and 2025.

Initially, the craft was placed in a heliocentric orbit similar to that of Earth. After both the spacecraft and Earth completed one and a half orbits, it returned to Earth to perform a gravity-assist maneuver and is deflected towards Venus. Two consecutive Venus flybys reduce the perihelion near to the Sun–Mercury distance with almost no need for thrust. After the fourth Mercury flyby, the craft will be in an orbit similar to that of Mercury and will remain in the general vicinity of Mercury (see ). Four final thrust arcs reduce the relative velocity to the point where Mercury will "weakly" capture the spacecraft on 5 December 2025 into polar orbit. The orbiters then separate and will adjust their orbits using chemical thrusters.

History 
The BepiColombo mission proposal was selected by ESA in 2000. A request for proposals for the science payload was issued in 2004. In 2007, Astrium was selected as the prime contractor, and Ariane 5 chosen as the launch vehicle. The initial target launch of July 2014 was postponed several times, mostly because of delays on the development of the solar electric propulsion system. The total cost of the mission was estimated in 2017 as US$2 billion.

Schedule 

, the mission schedule is:

Components

Mercury Transfer Module 

The Mercury Transfer Module (MTM) is located at the base of the stack. Its role is to carry the two science orbiters to Mercury and to support them during the cruise.

The MTM is equipped with a solar electric propulsion system as the main spacecraft propulsion. Its four QinetiQ-T6 ion thrusters operate singly or in pairs for a maximum combined thrust of 290 mN, making it the most powerful ion engine array ever operated in space. The MTM supplies electrical power for the two hibernating orbiters as well as for its solar electric propulsion system thanks to two  solar panels. Depending on the probe's distance to the Sun, the generated power will range between 7 and 14 kW, each T6 requiring between 2.5 and 4.5 kW according to the desired thrust level.

The solar electric propulsion system has typically very high specific impulse and low thrust. This leads to a flight profile with months-long continuous low-thrust braking phases, interrupted by planetary gravity assists, to gradually reduce the velocity of the spacecraft. Moments before Mercury orbit insertion, the MTM will be jettisoned from the spacecraft stack. After separation from the MTM, the MPO will provide Mio all necessary power and data resources until Mio is delivered to its mission orbit; separation of Mio from MPO will be accomplished by spin-ejection.

Mercury Planetary Orbiter 

The solar array requires continuous rotation keeping the Sun at a low incidence angle in order to generate adequate power while at the same time limiting the temperature.

The MPO will carry a payload of 11 instruments, comprising cameras, spectrometers (IR, UV, X-ray, γ-ray, neutron), a radiometer, a laser altimeter, a magnetometer, particle analysers, a Ka-band transponder, and an accelerometer. The payload components are mounted on the nadir side of the spacecraft to achieve low detector temperatures, apart from the MERTIS and PHEBUS spectrometers located directly at the main radiator to provide a better field of view.

A high-temperature-resistant  diameter high-gain antenna is mounted on a short boom on the zenith side of the spacecraft. Communications will be on the X-band and Ka-band with an average bit rate of 50 kbit/s and a total data volume of 1550 Gbit/year. ESA's Cebreros, Spain  ground station is planned to be the primary ground facility for communications during all mission phases.

Science payload 
The science payload of the Mercury Planetary Orbiter consists of eleven instruments:

 BepiColombo Laser Altimeter (BELA), developed by DLR in cooperation with the University of Bern, the Max Planck Institute for Solar System Research (MPS) and the Instituto de Astrofísica de Andalucía.
 Italian Spring Accelerometer (ISA), developed by Italy
 Mercury Magnetometer (MPO-MAG, MERMAG), developed by Germany and United Kingdom
 Mercury Radiometer and Thermal Infrared Spectrometer (MERTIS), developed by Germany
 Mercury Gamma-ray and Neutron Spectrometer (MGNS), developed by Russia
 Mercury Imaging X-ray Spectrometer (MIXS), developed and built by the University of Leicester, the Max Planck Institute for Solar System Research (MPS) and the Max Planck Institute for extraterrestrial Physics (MPE).
 Mercury Orbiter Radio-science Experiment (MORE), developed by Italy and the United States
 Probing of Hermean Exosphere by Ultraviolet Spectroscopy (PHEBUS), developed by France and Russia
 Search for Exosphere Refilling and Emitted Neutral Abundances (SERENA), made up of 2 neutral and 2 ionised particle analysers: ELENA (Emitted Low-Energy Neutral Atoms) developed by Italy; STROFIO (STart from a ROtating Field mass spectrOmeter) developed by United States; MIPA (Miniature Ion Precipitation Analyser) developed by Sweden; PICAM (Planetary Ion CAMera) developed by the Space Research Institute (Institut für Weltraumforschung, IWF), Russian Space Research Institute (IKI), Institut de recherche en sciences de l'environnement (CETP/IPSL), European Space Research and Technology Centre (ESTEC), Research Institute for Particle and Nuclear Physics (KFKI-RMKI) and the Max Planck Institute for Solar System Research (MPS).
 Spectrometers and Imagers for MPO BepiColombo Integrated Observatory System (SIMBIO-SYS), high resolution stereo cameras and a visual and near infrared spectrometer, developed by Italy, France and Switzerland
 Solar Intensity X-ray and Particle Spectrometer (SIXS), developed by Finland and United Kingdom.

Mio (Mercury Magnetospheric Orbiter) 

Mio will be spin stabilized at 15 rpm with the spin axis perpendicular to the equator of Mercury. The top and bottom of the octagon act as radiators with louvers for active temperature control. The sides are covered with solar cells which provide 90 watts. Communications with Earth will be through a  diameter X-band phased array high-gain antenna and two medium-gain antennas operating in the X-band. Telemetry will return 160 Gb/year, about 5 kbit/s over the lifetime of the spacecraft, which is expected to be greater than one year. The reaction and control system is based on cold gas thrusters. After its release in Mercury orbit, Mio will be operated by Sagamihara Space Operation Center using Usuda Deep Space Center  antenna located in Nagano, Japan.

Science payload 
Mio carries five groups of science instruments with a total mass of :
 Mercury Plasma Particle Experiment (MPPE), studies the plasma and neutral particles from the planet, its magnetosphere, and the solar wind. It will employ these instruments:
 Mercury Electron Analyzers (MEA1 and MEA2)
 Mercury Ion Analyzer (MIA)
 Mass Spectrum Analyzer (MSA), developed by Laboratory of Plasma Physics (LPP), Max Planck Institute for Solar System Research (MPS), IDA of Technical University of Braunschweig and Institute of Space and Astronautical Science (ISAS) 
 High-Energy Particle instrument for electrons (HEP-ele)
 High-Energy Particle instrument for Ions (HEP-ion)
 Energetic Neutrals Analyzer (ENA)
 Mercury Magnetometer (MMO-MGF), studies Mercury's magnetic field, magnetosphere, and interplanetary solar wind
 Plasma Wave Investigation (PWI), studies the electric field, electromagnetic waves, and radio waves from the magnetosphere and solar wind
 Mercury Sodium Atmosphere Spectral Imager (MSASI), studies the thin sodium atmosphere of Mercury
 Mercury Dust Monitor (MDM), studies dust from the planet and interplanetary space

Mercury Surface Element (cancelled) 
The Mercury Surface Element (MSE) was cancelled in 2003 due to budgetary constraints. At the time of cancellation, MSE was meant to be a small, lander designed to operate for about one week on the surface of Mercury. Shaped as a  diameter disc, it was designed to land at a latitude of 85° near the terminator region. Scientific data would be stored onboard and relayed via a cross-dipole UHF antenna to either the MPO or Mio. The MSE would have carried a  payload consisting of an imaging system (a descent camera and a surface camera), a heat flow and physical properties package, an alpha particle X-ray spectrometer, a magnetometer, a seismometer, a soil penetrating device (mole), and a micro-rover.

Artwork 
As with the Hayabusa2 mission, the BepiColombo mission is the topic of artwork. The manga artist Masayuki Ishikawa created a piece featuring the character Mercury from the manga Madowanai Hoshi, as well as the BepiColombo spacecraft.

See also 
 Exploration of Mercury
 MESSENGER – the first spacecraft to orbit Mercury

References

External links 
 BepiColombo website by the European Space Agency
 BepiColombo Operations website by the European Space Agency
 BepiColombo website by JAXA
 BepiColombo website by JAXA's Institute of Space and Astronautical Science
 BepiColombo website by NASA's Solar System Exploration
 BepiColombo website by the National Space Science Data Center
 The BepiColombo mission to Mercury, edited by Johannes Benkhoff, Go Murakami and Ayako Matsuoka. Space Science Reviews. 216–217 (2020–2021)
 BepiColombo article on eoPortal by ESA

Missions to Mercury
European Space Agency space probes
Japanese space probes
Orbiters (space probe)
Space probes launched in 2018
Spacecraft launched by Ariane rockets
2018 in French Guiana